Zinc fluoride  (ZnF2) is an inorganic chemical compound. It is encountered as the anhydrous form and also as the tetrahydrate, ZnF2 · 4H2O (rhombohedral crystal structure). It has a high melting point and has the  rutile structure containing 6 coordinate zinc, which suggests appreciable ionic character in its chemical bonding. Unlike the other zinc halides, ZnCl2, ZnBr2 and ZnI2, it is not very soluble in water.

Like some other metal difluorides, ZnF2 crystallizes in the rutile structure, which features octahedral Zn centers and planar fluorides.

Preparation and reactions
Zinc fluoride can be synthesized several ways.
Reaction of a fluoride salt with zinc chloride, to yield zinc fluoride and a chloride salt, in aqueous solution.
The reaction of zinc metal with fluorine gas.
Reaction of hydrofluoric acid with zinc, to yield hydrogen gas (H2) and zinc fluoride (ZnF2).

Zinc fluoride can be hydrolysed by hot water to form the zinc hydroxyfluoride, Zn(OH)F.

References

External links
 

zinc
Metal halides
fluoride